The  (often shortened to Kawamura Memorial Museum) is an art museum in Sakura, Japan, designed by . The museum opened in 1990 and its collection now contains more than 1000 works collected by the Japanese resin and ink manufacturer DIC Corporation. The project was largely the brainchild of Katsumi Kawamura, the former president of DIC, founder and first director of the museum, who had been collecting art since the 1970s. The Kawamura Memorial Museum contains artwork by a wide selection of American, European and Japanese artists, including special exhibitions of the works of Mark Rothko and Frank Stella.

Around the museum, a 30-hectare park with over 200 kinds of trees, 500 kinds of plants and inhabited by many wild birds and insects invites for walking and enjoying nature.

Public response
According to DIC corporation, the museum has had a positive impact on the image of the company. At the end of the 20th century, the museum was attracting over 300,000 visitors each year. Former president Shigekuni Kawamura commented that 'customers...evaluate us highly as a cultivated, international company which is not concerned solely with its business. This is not an outcome we planned, but is a very satisfying one'.

Access
Opening hours are 9:30-17:00 (last admission 16:30); the museum is closed on Mondays (except national holidays, then closed next non-holiday) and between December 25 to January 1. The museum may close temporarily during the installation of an exhibition.
A free shuttle bus connects JR Sakura station and Keisei-Sakura Station with the museum. Additionally, it is connected to Tokyo station by expressway bus. And, there are community buses that are run by Sakura and pass through near this museum, bus stops that you should get on and off are Saifuku-ji bus stop-西福寺(13) and Sakado bus stop-坂戸(16). In the case of getting off Saifuku-ji bus stop-西福寺(13), you should go to Monoi Station, the community bus departures from Monoi Station(1). In the case of getting off Sakado bus stop-坂戸(16), you should go to Chishirodai Station, the community bus departures from Chishirodai Station(14). Fares for both of the community buses are 200 yen(adult). Besides, it takes 10 minutes by foot from both bus stops.

Main works

References

External links
 Museum homepage (in English)
 Kawamura Memorial DIC Museum of Art within Google Arts & Culture

Art museums and galleries in Japan
Museums in Chiba Prefecture
Sakura, Chiba